School of Astronautics, HIT is the Engineering school of Harbin Institute of Technology. The school is the first-ever school to initiate college education in astronautics discipline in China.

There are approximately 302 full-time faculty members consisting of assistant, associate, and full professors in School of Astronautics, Harbin Institute of Technology.

Faculty
Under the efforts made by generations of scholars, the school has gradually built up a profound academic foundation and developed a qualified group of distinguished scholars and well-known specialists. The paragon for the intellectuals today, Ma Zuguang has been praised as the top representative of the educators in HIT. The School of Astronautics ranks high both in education and research.

At present, there are 123 professors among 302 staff members, including:

 6 academicians of Chinese Academy of Engineering / Sciences
 9 Changjiang Scholar professors
 3 Changjiang Visiting professors
 5 winners of the National Outstanding Youth Foundation
 2 national famous teachers
 1 state-level teaching group
 1 innovation group of the Chinese National Natural Science Foundation
 3 innovation groups of the Ministry of Education
 3 innovation groups of national defense science and technology
 21 persons selected in the supporting program sponsored by National Education Committee & National Education Department

Postgraduate
The school enrolls and educates about 400 Master students and 200 PhD candidates every year.

More than 40 students are A PhD candidate from HIT is in Bauman Moscow State Technical University, Russia.

IEEE HIT Student Branch 

IEEE HIT student branch was established in 2008. Currently, there are 62 IEEE student members and over 50 volunteers. The branch has held more than 10 professional and technical meetings and seminars, and has given assistance to several visiting IEEE leaders and professors. Furthermore, it has organized activities for visiting industry-related companies, in which more than 1000 students participated. In 2016, the National Conference on Microwave and National Conference on Electromagnetic Compatibility will be held in Harbin.

Cooperation with other universities 
The school has established a close relationship with several research institutes of China Aerospace Science and Technology Corporation and China Aerospace Science and Industry Corporation. The school has set up internship bases in these institutes for students, and invited several specialists as part-time professors, including Sun Jiadong, Chief designer of Chinese Lunar Orbiting Detection Project and Wang Yongzhi, Chief designer of Chinese Manned Space Project.

The school has maintained close collaboration with Chinese General Armament Department and the Chinese Rocket Force.

Seminar in Astronautics are frequently held in collaboration with other research institutes .

International exchange 

The school actively undertakes international exchange through communication and cooperation with related departments in more than 20 universities worldwide. The school has also invited 5 long-term overseas visiting specialists, and 17 overseas honorary specialists to share knowledge with students. In the past 3 years, the school has held about 10 international academic conferences, and has invited nearly 100 foreign specialists to give lectures.

Domestic collaboration 

The Deep Space Detection Research Center has held COSPAR Capacity Building Workshop 2009-Lunar and Planetary Surface Science.
The Space Control and Inertial Technology Research Center has held the 1 st International Symposium on System and Control of Aeronautics and Astronautics (ISSCAA2007).
The 2007 Conference on Smart Material and Nano Technology was held in HIT, which was hosted by the Center for Composite Materials and Structures and co-sponsored by International Society For Optical Engineering(SPIE), and USA National Science Foundation(NSF).
Academician Du Shanyi, the only Chinese member of International Composite Material Committee
Professor He Xiaodong was invited to deliver a plenary presentation in SAMPE Asia

Cooperation with Russia and Ukraine 

School of Astronautics, HIT has a long history of collaboration with Russia and Ukraine. The school has kept a close relationship with Moscow University and Bauman Moscow State Technical University. Nowadays, graduates from the Teachers' Training Class for Spacecraft held by Samara State Aerospace University have become leaders in various Chinese spacecraft programs.

Teaching experiment equipments, such as the returning capsule introduced from Russia, are playing significant roles in manned spaceflight education of the school.

Outstanding Alumni

Notable graduates 

A number of graduates from the school have become leaders in the Chinese aerospace industry as well as other fields.
 Song Jian: missile scientist, the main architect and proponent of China's one-child policy
 General Li Jinai: the director of PLA General Political Department
 General Hu Shixiang: the former vice minister of PLA General Armament Department
 Ma Xingrui: aerospace engineer, the current Governor of Guangdong
 Academician Liu Zhusheng: chief designer of CZ-2F
 Yang Baohua: director of Chinese Academy of Space Technology
 Zhang Bainan: chief designer of Shenzhou 7 Program
 Zhang Simin: founder and current president of Hai Wang Corporation
 Gao Qunyao: the vice president of Global News Corporation

Notable professors 

 Ma Zuguang: paragon for Chinese intellectuals today, academician of Chinese Academy of Engineering, well-known specialist in optics
 Huang Wenhu: academician of Chinese Academy of Engineering, in the field of mechanics and aircraft failure diagnosis
 Wang Zicai: academician of Chinese Academy of Engineering, in the field of system control and simulation
 Du Shanyi: academician of Chinese Academy of Engineering, in the field of mechanics and composite materials
 Chen Yushu: academician of Chinese Academy of Engineering, in the field of engineering nonlinear dynamics
 Yu Menglun: academician of Chinese Academy of Engineering, in the field of missile trajectory design
 Luan Enjie: academician of Chinese Academy of Engineering, in the field of missile control andengineering management in astronautics

External links

References 

Astronautics